The Creighton River is a  tributary of the West Branch Manistique River on the Upper Peninsula of Michigan in the United States.

See also
List of rivers of Michigan

References

Michigan  Streamflow Data from the USGS

Rivers of Michigan
Rivers of Schoolcraft County, Michigan
Tributaries of Lake Michigan